Valentino Valli (1 December 1929 – 16 February 2022) was an Italian professional footballer who played for Edera Ravenna, S.P.A.L., Como, Legnano, Chinotto Neri, Piombino, Milan, Atalanta, FEDIT and Tevere Roma. He died on 16 February 2022, at the age of 92.

References

1929 births
2022 deaths
Italian footballers
Ravenna F.C. players
S.P.A.L. players
Como 1907 players
A.C. Legnano players
Atletico Piombino players
A.C. Milan players
Atalanta B.C. players
Serie B players
Serie A players
Sportspeople from Ravenna
Footballers from Emilia-Romagna